Hem Singh Bhadana is an Indian politician who served as a Member of the Rajasthan Legislative Assembly representing the Thanagazi Vidhan Sabha constituency as an Independent candidate.

References 

Living people
Bharatiya Janata Party politicians from Rajasthan
Rajasthan MLAs 2013–2018
Year of birth missing (living people)